Spinning top is a Japanese candlesticks pattern with a short body found in the middle of two long wicks. A spinning top is indicative of a situation where neither the buyers nor the sellers have won for that time period, as the market has closed relatively unchanged from where it opened; the market is indecisive regarding its trend. The upper and lower long wicks, however, tell us that both the buyers and the sellers had the upper hand at some point during the time period the candle represents. When a spinning top forms after a run up or run down in the market, it can be an indication of a pending reversal, as the indecision in the market is representative of the buyers losing momentum when this occurs after an uptrend and the sellers losing momentum after a downtrend.

Examples

See also
 Candlestick chart
 Candlestick pattern

External links
 Spinning Tops Video and Chart Examples

Candlestick patterns